The 2013 WAC men's basketball tournament was the 30th basketball tournament hosted by the WAC and was held March 12–16, 2013  at the Orleans Arena in Paradise, Nevada. The winner, New Mexico State University, received an automatic bid to the 2013 NCAA tournament.  The 2013 Championship game was televised on ESPNU.  With the departure of Nevada, and Fresno State to the Mountain West, and Hawaii to the Big West, and the additions of Denver, Seattle, Texas–Arlington, UTSA, and Texas State the WAC held a ten-team tournament for 2013.

Bracket

All times listed are Pacific

References

Tournament
WAC men's basketball tournament
WAC men's basketball tournament
WAC men's basketball tournament
Basketball competitions in the Las Vegas Valley
College basketball tournaments in Nevada
College sports tournaments in Nevada